Frisby and Kirby, formerly just Frisby is a former civil parish in the Melton district, in the county of Leicestershire, England. Its principal settlements were the villages of Frisby on the Wreake and Kirby Bellars, now both civil parishes in their own right. In 2001 it had a population of 890.

History 
The parish was formed on 1 April 1936 as "Frisby" from the parishes of "Frisby on the Wreak" and "Kirby Bellars". On 30 July 1980 it was renamed "Frisby & Kirby".

On 1 April 2005 the parish was abolished and split to "Frisby on the Wreake" and "Kirby Bellars".

References 

Former civil parishes in Leicestershire
2005 disestablishments in England
Borough of Melton